Zwaluwen 1930 is a football club from Hoorn, Netherlands. The club was founded in 1930. Zwaluwen is competing in the Eerste Klasse, after one continuous run in the Hoofdklasse, from 2007 through 2012.

In Fall 2011 Zwaluwen '30 lost in the second round of the national cup to GVVV.

Managers
   Miswanto Da Harrick (1996–1999)

References

External links
 Official site 

Football clubs in the Netherlands
Football clubs in Hoorn
Association football clubs established in 1930
1930 establishments in the Netherlands